Presidential elections were held in Ecuador on 20 and 21 October 1931. The result was a victory for Neptali Bonifaz, who received 45.3% of the vote. However, he was disqualified by Congress the following year as he had held Peruvian citizenship, and fresh elections were held in October 1932.

Results

References

Presidential elections in Ecuador
Ecuador
1931 in Ecuador
Annulled elections
October 1931 events
Election and referendum articles with incomplete results